The Patriotic Association of Myanmar, abbreviated Ma Ba Tha in Burmese and variously translated into English as Association for the Protection of Race and Religion, Organisation for the Protection of Race and Religion and Committee for the Protection of Nationality and Religion is an ultra nationalist Buddhist organisation based in Myanmar (Burma). Some PAB members are connected to the 969 Movement.

Establishment
On 15 January 2014, PAB was formally established at a large based conference of Buddhist monks in Mandalay, with the mission of defending Theravada Buddhism in Burma. Its Pali name is Sāsana Vaṃsa Pāla, which literally means "protector of race and Śāsana."

PAB may have been formed in response to the State Sangha Maha Nayaka Committee's prohibition of the '969' emblem for political uses.

Leadership
PAB is led by a central committee composed of 52 members, including both senior scholar monks and nationalist monks. Ashin Wirathu is a prominent member of PAB and is described as "the leader of the most extreme fringe" of the group. PAB has extensive networks and chapters at state and township levels across Burma. PAB is currently chaired by the Ywama Sayadaw Ashin Tilokabhivamsa. Its headquarters are located Ywama Pariyatti Monastery (ရွာမပရိယတ္တိ စာသင်တိုက်), Insein Township, Yangon Region.

Legislative lobbying
In 2013, the Burmese Ministry of Religious Affairs drafted 4 controversial Race and Religion Protection Laws designed to regulate religious conversion and interfaith marriage, and enforce monogamy and population-control measures, based on draft texts proposed by PAB members. In March 2015, the country's lower house, the Pyithu Hluttaw, approved two of the bills. The first of the 4 laws, which regulates population-control measures, was enacted in May 2015.

Campaigns
In 2014, PAB members began a campaign against Ooredoo, a Qatar-based telecommunications company that had entered the country to build its cellular infrastructure.

In 2016 supporters of Ma Ba Tha campaigned against the Rohingya on Facebook.

Later activities
In May 2017, the State Sangha Maha Nayaka Committee, which regulates the Buddhist clergy, ordered the group disbanded. The group renamed itself as the Buddha Dhamma Charity Foundation, which was also outlawed, according to government officials.

In June 2019, Brigadier General Zaw Min Tun donated 30 million kyats to the Buddha Dhamma Parahita Foundation, a successor group, after its members protested the government's lawsuit against their leader Wirathu.

See also

 Bodu Bala Sena
 969 Movement

References

External links
Dhamma Vaṃsānurakkhita Association of Myanmar

Buddhist organisations based in Myanmar
2014 establishments in Myanmar
Political organizations established in 2014
Religious organizations established in 2014
Violence against Muslims
Far-right politics in Myanmar
Buddhist nationalism
Anti-Islam sentiment in Myanmar